Right Here, Right Now is a 2002 DVD by Atomic Kitten. The DVD was recorded at Waterfront Hall in Belfast in 2002 during their tour and features the live band "The Phat Cats", and also contains "The Kitten Diaries" which was 48 minute documentary previously aired by Channel 4 made by the girl group themselves consisting of backstage footage during their 2002 United Kingdom tour, rehearsals for shows, and the making of "It's OK!" in South Africa. The diary was mainly shot using handheld cameras.

Track listing

Personnel

External links
 Official site
 IMDB entry for "The Kitten Diaries"

Atomic Kitten video albums
2002 video albums
Live video albums
2002 live albums